The 2009 Horizon League men's basketball tournament was held at the end of the 2008–2009 regular season. The better seed hosted each first round match.  The second and third rounds were played at Hinkle Fieldhouse in Indianapolis.  The championship game was played at the home court of the highest remaining seed, also Hinkle Fieldhouse, the home court of the Butler men's basketball team.

Regular season standings

 Cleveland State was seeded ahead of Wright State based on a better Ratings Percentage Index (RPI) score, all other
tiebreakers having failed to distinguish the two teams.

 Youngstown State finished ahead of Illinois-Chicago based on head-to-head record.

Bracket

First round games at campus sites of lower-numbered seeds
Second round and semifinals will be hosted by Butler.
Championship will be hosted by lower-numbered remaining seed

All-Tournament Team
MVP: Cedric Jackson, Cleveland State
J'Nathan Bullock, Cleveland State
Norris Cole, Cleveland State
Matt Howard, Butler
Shelvin Mack, Butler

References

Tournament
Horizon League men's basketball tournament
Horizon
Horizon League men's basketball tournament
Horizon League men's basketball tournament
College basketball tournaments in Indiana